The Deputy Prime Minister of Armenia is the official deputy of the head of government of Armenia.

According to Constitution of Armenia the number of Deputy Prime Ministers can be up to three.

The current Deputy Prime Ministers are Tigran Avinyan and Mher Grigoryan.

List of deputy prime ministers of Armenia

List of first deputy prime ministers of Armenia

See also 

 Government of Armenia
 Prime Minister of Armenia

Notes

References

External links 

 The Government of Armenia

Armenia

Deputy prime ministers